Sharon Jane Taylor, Baroness Taylor of Stevenage,  (born 1956) is a British politician and life peer. She has served as the leader of Stevenage Borough Council in Hertfordshire, England, since 2006.

In October 2022, it was announced that she would receive a life peerage, sitting in the House of Lords for the Labour Party. On 28 October 2022, she was created Baroness Taylor of Stevenage, of Stevenage in the County of Hertfordshire. She took her seat on 31 October 2022.

A member of the Labour Party, Taylor became a local councillor in 1997, representing her home area of Symonds Green, and leader of the council in 2006. Before this, she was Head of Executive Support at Hertfordshire Constabulary. Before that, she worked for John Lewis and British Aerospace.

In 2008, Taylor became a county councillor for Hertfordshire County Council. In the 2010, 2015 and 2017 general elections, she unsuccessfully contested the constituency of Stevenage. She was appointed an Officer of the Order of the British Empire (OBE) for services to local government in the 2013 New Year Honours.

Taylor is divorced and has three children.

In February 2023, she accepted the role of Patron of The Stevenage Community Trust. Taylor has been a supporter since the trust's inception in 1990.

References

Living people
Labour Party (UK) councillors
Labour Party (UK) life peers
Life peeresses created by Charles III
21st-century English women politicians
People from Stevenage
1956 births
Labour Party (UK) parliamentary candidates
Members of Hertfordshire County Council
Women councillors in England
Leaders of local authorities of England